The 1982 European Fencing Championships were held in Mödling, Austria. The competition consisted of individual events only.

Medal summary

Men's events

Women's events

Medal table

References 
 Results at the European Fencing Confederation

1982
European Fencing Championships
International fencing competitions hosted by Austria
European Fencing Championships